Marius Holtet (born August 31, 1984) is a Norwegian former professional ice hockey forward.

Holtet is drafted by the Dallas Stars, Holtet is also the Norwegian player who's been drafted highest overall ever, being a 42nd overall pick.

Career
Holtet started his professional career in 2000 when he signed with Swedish Elitserien club Färjestads BK. Between 2000 and 2002 he played with the club's junior team. At the start of the 2002/03 season he was assigned to one of Färjestads farm teams, Skåre BK. Later that season he was moved to the Farjestad other farm team, Bofors IK of HockeyAllsvenskan. Holtet played with Bofors the rest of the season and also the next.

After the 2004/05 Holtet decided to sign with the Stars, who had drafted him three years earlier. The first season with the Stars' organization Holtet spent with the ECHL team Louisiana IceGators and the AHL team Houston Aeros. The second Holtet spent with another AHL team, the Iowa Stars. After three seasons in AHL he signed a two-year contract with his former club Färjestads BK.

Holtet was forced to retire in 2015 due head injuries.

International
Holtet has represented Norway in several International tournaments. In 2006, he played with Norway at the Ice Hockey World Championship in Latvia. He also represented Norway at the 2008 IIHF World Championship in Canada.

Career statistics

Regular season and playoffs

International

References

External links

THN.com
Norwegian born players drafted by NHL teams

1984 births
Living people
Bofors IK players
Dallas Stars draft picks
Färjestad BK players
Houston Aeros (1994–2013) players
Ice hockey players at the 2010 Winter Olympics
Iowa Stars players
Louisiana IceGators (ECHL) players
Norwegian ice hockey right wingers
Olympic ice hockey players of Norway
Sportspeople from Hamar